Jatun Kimray Punta (Quechua jatun big, kimray, kinray slope, also spelled Jatun Quinray Punta) is a mountain in the Bolivian Andes which reaches a height of approximately . It is located in the Cochabamba Department, Quillacollo Province, Quillacollo Municipality. Jatun Kimray Punta lies east of P'utu P'utu.

References 

Mountains of Cochabamba Department